The Outies, formally known as the Out & Equal Workplace Awards, is an annual awards gala hosted by Out & Equal Workplace Advocates. The Outies honor individuals and organizations that are leaders in advancing equality for lesbian, gay, bisexual, and transgender (LGBT) employees in America's workplaces. Through these awards, Out & Equal provides the business and LGBT communities with examples of innovative approaches and proven successes to help create safe and equitable workplaces. The awards are presented annually at the Out & Equal Workplace Summit, a nationwide conference addressing LGBT issues in the workplace.

Outie Awards are given in five different categories, with two recognizing individuals and three recognizing organizations. To win an Outie, recipients must have taken significant action to create more equitable workplaces for members of the LGBT community.

Award categories
The Workplace Excellence Award recognizes any employer that has an historic and ongoing commitment to pursuing and executing workplace equality for LGBT employees in their own workplace. This employer has a history of continually raising the bar of workplace equality for others to follow.

The Trailblazer Award recognizes an LGBT person who has made a significant contribution to advancing workplace equality. This individual's activities will have made a marked improvement in their own workplace and/or have contributed to equality nationally.

The Champion Award recognizes any LGBTQ person or ally who has made a significant contribution to advancing workplace equality. The Champion Award winner will have shown a unique commitment to LGBTQ workplace rights and will have used their talents to further that cause, even if at some risk..

The LGBT ERG of the Year Award recognizes a particular employee resource group (ERG), sometimes referred to as a business group or network, that has a proven track record of success in advocating for LGBT equal rights in its own workplace.

The Regional Affiliate of the Year Award recognizes an Out & Equal regional affiliate that has demonstrated commitment to the Out & Equal mission through exceptional programming and sound organizational practices.

The Significant Achievement Award recognizes any employer that has made significant strides in the past year in advancing a fair and equitable workplace for its LGBT employees, such as: announcing domestic partner health insurance, including gender identity diversity training, or initiating a unique general advertising campaign that includes LGBT people.

Selection process
All Outie nominations are read by the Out & Equal awards committee and judging panel, which is made up of a diverse cross-section of leaders in the movement for LGBT workplace equality. Awards Committee members and judges change each year and are expected to opt out of voting if their own affiliations may bias their votes.

Nominees are evaluated on originality, duplicability of initiatives, leadership, results, and other criteria. Organizations are evaluated based on the aforementioned criteria, plus the degree to which they have incorporated the 20 Steps to an Out & Equal Workplace. The previous year's awardees are not considered for the same award for the following two years. Additionally, companies or organizations may only submit one nomination in the organization award categories and one nomination in the individual award categories, for a maximum possible total of two nominations from any one company or organization.

Outie Award winners

Workplace Excellence Award 
Recognizes any employer that has a longstanding commitment to pursuing and executing workplace equality for LGBT employees in their own workplace. This employer has a history of continually raising the bar of workplace equality for others to follow.
 2017 - Bank of America
 2016 - Dell
 2015 - The Walt Disney Company
 2014 – Chevron
 2013 – Dow Chemical Company
 2012 – Google
 2011 – Accenture
 2010 – IBM
 2009 – Sun Microsystems
 2008 – PepsiCo
 2007 - Wells Fargo
 2006 – JPMorgan Chase
 2005 - Citigroup
 2004 - Kaiser Permanente and Pacific Gas & Electric Company (Tied)
 2003 - NCR Corporation
 2002 - American Airlines
 2001 – IBM
 2000 – Kodak

Trailblazer Award 
Recognizes an LGBT person who has made a significant contribution to advancing workplace equality. This individual's activities will have made a marked improvement in their own workplace and/or have contributed to equality nationally.
 2014 – Greer Puckett, Northrop Grumman
 2012 – Lance Freedman, Lockheed Martin
 2011 – Claudia Woody, IBM
 2010 – Bill Hendrix, Dow Chemical Company
 2009 - Richard Clark, Accenture
 2008 - Chris Crespo, Ernst & Young
 2007 - Dr. Judy Lively, Kaiser Permanente
 2006 – Emily Jones, Kodak
 2005 - Leslie (Les) Hohman, General Motors PLUS
 2004 - Robert Burrell, Ford
 2003 - Wesley Combs, Witeck-Combs Communications
 2002 - Dr. Louise Young, Raytheon
 2001 - Mary Ann Horton, Avaya
 2000 - Tom Ammiano, Leslie Katz and Susan Leal, San Francisco Supervisors

Champion Award 
The Champion Award recognizes any LGBTQ+ person or ally who has made a significant contribution to advancing workplace equality. The Champion Award winner will have shown a unique commitment to LGBTQ+ workplace rights and will have used their talents to further that cause, even if at some risk...

 2018 - Jennifer J. Henderson, Capital One
 2017 - Ramkrishna Sinha, Intel Corporation
 2016 - Thomas Vilsack, USDA Secretary
 2015 - Howard Ungerleider, Dow Chemical Company
 2014 – Vijay Anand, Intuit
 2013 – Cathy Bessant, Bank of America
 2012 – Harry van Dorenmalen, IBM
 2011 – Dr. Sophie Vandebroek, Xerox
 2010 – Mark Bertolini, Aetna Healthcare
 2009 - Randy Kammer, Blue Cross and Blue Shield of Florida
 2008 - William C. Thompson, Jr., City of New York
 2007 - Ana Duarte McCarthy, Citi
 2006 – Deborah Dagit, Merck
 2005 - June R. Cohen, DuPont
 2004 - Laura Brooks, Kodak
 2003 - Judy Boyette, University of California
 2002 - William Perez, CEO of SC Johnson & Son
 2001 - Cathy Brill & Lisa Vitale, Kodak
 2000 - Ethel Batten, Lucent

LGBT Employee Resource Group of the Year 
Recognizes a particular employee resource group (ERG), sometimes referred to as a business group or network that has a proven track record of success in advocating for LGBT equal rights in its own workplace.
 2018 - LGBT Alliance (Cracker Barrel)
 2017 - IC Pride – (US Intelligence Community)
 2016 - PRIDE Team Network – (Wells Fargo)
 2015 - Open & Out (Johnson & Johnson)
 2014 – Citi PRIDE Network
 2013 – PRIDE (Lockheed Martin) & LGBTA Business Council (Target)
 2012 – OutServe (United States Department of Defense)
 2011 – LGBT Pride Resource Group, Bank of America
 2010 – The Clorox Company
 2009 - (Tie) General Motors' People Like Us & US Department of State and USAID's Gays and Lesbians in Foreign Affairs Agencies
 2008 - Hewlett-Packard's HP PRIDE
 2007 - Nike's GLBT & Friends Network
 2006 – GLEAM, Microsoft
 2005 - Chevron Lesbian & Gay Employee Association (CLGEA)
 2004 - Lambda Network at Kodak
 2003 – GLBC at SC Johnson
 2002 - SEA Shell at Shell Oil Company
 2001 - Pride at Walt Disney
 2000 - League of AT&T

Regional Affiliate of the Year Award 
Recognizes an Out & Equal regional affiliate that has demonstrated commitment to the Out & Equal mission through exceptional programming and sound organizational practices.
 2015 - San Francisco
 2014 – Chicagoland
 2013 – Seattle
 2012 – New York Finger Lakes
 2011 – Houston
 2010 – Dallas–Fort Worth

Significant Achievement 
 2011 – Google
 2010 – Dow Chemical Company
 2009 – Salt Lake City Corporation
 2008 – Goldman Sachs
 2007 - Ernst & Young
 2006 – PricewaterhouseCoopers
 2005 - IBM
 2004 - Hewlett Packard
 2003 - Chubb
 2002 – JPMorgan Chase
 2001 - Motorola
 2000 - Ford

Selisse Berry Leadership Award 
Recognizes an exceptional individual whose visionary leadership, tireless efforts, and remarkable accomplishments have been a critical contribution toward achieving LGBT workplace equality. In addition to leading change in the world of employment, this leader inspires countless individuals to champion workplace equality for all inclusive of sexual orientation, gender identity, expression, or characteristics.
 2013 – Kevin Jones
 2011 – Brian McNaught
 2008 – Selisse Berry, Founding Executive Director of Out & Equal

LGBT Workplace Equality Pioneer 
 2007 - Dr. Franklin E. Kameny

References

American awards
LGBT-related awards
Business and industry awards
Awards established in 2000